This list details about chronological aspect of the Derg, the military junta that ruled Ethiopia from 1974 to 1987 by decade.

1970s

1974 
12 February – Mutinies took place at the Ethiopian Air Force Base at Bishoftu.
25 February – Mutinies occurred in Second Division at Asmara.
23 March – Prime Minister Endalkachew Mekonnen formed armed forces coordinated committee which its members did not support his government.
28 June – a group of military officers announced the new military junta, the Derg, officially the Coordinating Committee of the Armed Forces.
July – the Derg obtained key concession of the Emperor Haile Selassie that can access the power to arrest the government officials in every level; both Aklilu Habte-Wold and Endalkachew Mekonnen along with their cabinets, regional governors, many senior military officers and officials were imprisoned soon after.
August – the Derg began dismantling the imperial government to forestall further development following a proposed constitution that offer constitutional monarchy.
12 September – the Derg deposed and imprisoned Emperor Haile Selassie
15 September – the committee renamed itself Provisional Military Administrative Council (PMAC) and took control of all governmental facilities.
23 November – 60 former imperial government of Haile Selassie were summarily executed along with Gen. Aman Adom.
28 November – the Derg elected Brigadier General Tafari Banti as a chairman of the Derg, while Mengistu Haile Mariam and Atnafu Abate were elected as vice-chairmen.

1975 
 18 February – the Tigray People's Liberation Front (TPLF) formed as the spearhead opposition group
 4 March – the Derg announced a land reform with main slogan "Land for the Tiller".
 21 March – Monarchy of the Ethiopian Empire was abolished and Marxism-Leninism became the new ideology of the state.
 27 August – Haile Selassie died from mysterious circumstances while his personal physician absented. It was believed that Mengistu killed him by order or in his own.

1977 
3 February – Mengistu elected as the chairman of the Derg with undisputed leadership.
17 April – the first wave of Red Terror officially declared.
 13 July – Ogaden War began with invasion of Somalia.

1980s

1983 
 1983–1985 famine in Ethiopia began in Ethiopian four provinces, Tigray, Wollo, Gojjam and Hararghe, resulted in 400,000 deaths.

1985 
 July – the famine garnered international attention especially from Western community. The Oxfam and Live Aid concerted charity which ignited controversy whether NGOs in Ethiopia were under the control of Derg government or Oxfam and Live Aid coordinated to the Derg's enforced resettlement programmes, which displaced and killed between 50,000 and 100,000 people.

1987 
 22 February – the 1987 constitution adopted
 12 September – the People's Democratic Republic of Ethiopia was established.

1988 
 8 May – the rebel created new coalition named the Ethiopian People's Revolutionary Democratic Front (EPRDF)

1989 
 The Amhara Democratic Party (ANDM) joined with EPRDF to fight the Derg

1990s 
 December – the Soviet Union ceased to aid the PDRE in line with the 1989 revolution in Eastern bloc.

1991 
 January – EPRDF took Gondar, Bahir Dar and Dessie while the Eritrean People's Liberation Front (EPLF) took all of Eritrea except Assab and Asmara in the south.
 March – the Afar Liberation Front (ALF) joined EPRDF
 April – the rebel crossed Shewa and Welega to Addis Ababa
 21 May – President Mengistu managed to flee the country through Kenya border into Zimbabwe, where still lives today. 
 27 May – the rebel took control Jimma, Agaro and Gambela.
 28 May – the rebel successfully seized Addis Ababa with nonviolence condition. Approximately 1,900 Derg officials detained thereafter.

1992 
 The Special Prosecutor Office (SPO) was launched in order to investigate human rights violations committed during the Red Terror and the Derg regime as whole.

1994 
 October – SPO submitted 73 Derg officials to Central Higher Court for the first time.
 13 December – the first charge was filed.

2000s

2006 
 12 December – the Federal Supreme Court found guilty of 55 Derg officials, 22, including Mengistu, were charged in absentia.

2007 
 11 January – Detainees were sentenced to life imprisonment to 23 years rigorous punishment.

2008 
 26 May – the trial ended with most officials being sentenced to death.

2010s

2011 
 4 October – 16 Derg officials were released after serving 20 years incarceration.

References 

Derg
History of Ethiopia